The 2014 Castle Point Borough Council election took place on 22 May 2014 to elect members of Castle Point Borough Council in Essex, England. One third of the council was up for election and the Conservative Party lost overall control of the council to no overall control.

After the election, the composition of the council was
Conservative 20
Canvey Island Independent Party 16
UK Independence Party 5

Background
At the last election in 2012 the Conservatives held control of the council with 25 councillors, compared to 15 for the Canvey Island Independent Party and 1 independent. However, since then the UK Independence Party had won 2 Castle Point seats at the 2013 Essex County Council election and planned to stand 8 candidates at the 2014 Borough Council election.

14 of the 41 seats on the council were contested at the 2014 election.

Election result
The Conservatives lost their majority on the council after the UK Independence Party gained 5 seats. The UK Independence Party gains came in Appleton, Cedar Hall, St George's, St Peter's and Victoria wards, with 87-year-old UK Independence Party candidate Ron Hurrell defeating the Conservative leader of the council, Pam Challis, in St Peter's ward. Meanwhile, in the European elections that were held at the same time the UK Independence Party won 48% of the vote in Castle Point, almost double that of the Conservatives.

On Canvey Island the Canvey Island Independent Party regained a seat in Canvey Island South, which they had lost to a defection. The results left the Conservatives as the largest party on the council with 20 seats, while the Canvey Island Independent Party had 16 seats and the UK Independence Party had 5 seats.

Following the election the Conservative group on the council chose Colin Riley as their new leader defeating the former deputy leader of the council Jeffrey Stanley by 2 votes, while Alan Bayley became the leader of the UK Independence Party group. Both the Canvey Island Independent Party and UK Independence Party initially proposed a coalition between all 3 parties to run the council, but following the Conservative leadership election decided against coalition and Colin Riley became the new leader of the council at the head of a Conservative minority administration.

Ward results

By-elections between 2014 and 2015
A by-election was held in Canvey Island East on 30 October 2014 after Canvey Island Independent Party councillor Gail Barton was removed from the council for not attending any council meetings for 8 months. The UK Independence Party did not put up a candidate for the by-election, instead supporting the Canvey Island Independent Party candidate, while the Canvey Island Independents agreed to support the UK Independence Party at the 2015 general election. However the seat was gained by independent candidate Colin Letchford with a majority of 66 votes over the Canvey Island Independent Party.

Meanwhile, following the by-election, councillor Stephen Cole defected from the Canvey Island Independent Party to the Conservatives, with the agreement between the Canvey Island Independent Party and the UK Independence Party being cited as a factor in his decision. This meant following the by-election and defection the Conservatives regained a one-seat majority on the council with 21 seats, compared to 14 for the Canvey Island Independent Party, 5 for the UK Independence Party and 1 independent.

References

Castle Point Borough Council elections
2014 English local elections
2010s in Essex